Esbjörn is a Swedish name. 

People with surname Esbjörn:
 Lars Paul Esbjörn (1808–1870), Swedish-American Lutheran clergyman

People with given name Esbjörn:
 Esbjörn Segelod (b. 1951), Swedish organizational theorist  
 Esbjörn Svensson (1964–2008), Swedish jazz pianist

See also 
 Esbjörn Svensson Trio
 Espen

Swedish masculine given names